Mount Black is a mountain on the West Coast Range located in the West Coast region of Tasmania, Australia.

The Murchison Highway passes around its lower slopes.

It is the location of some former exploration and mine sites.

See also

 List of highest mountains of Tasmania

References

Black, Mount
Black, Mount